Star-K Kosher Certification, also known as the Vaad Hakashrut of Baltimore, is a kosher certification agency based in Baltimore, Maryland, under the administration of Rabbi Moshe Heinemann, with the involvement of many other rabbis. It is one of the largest Jewish dietary certification agencies in North America. It is trusted by many Orthodox Jews worldwide for dedication to preserving Kashrut. The organization supervises tens of thousands of commercial food products and food establishments (such as restaurants and caterers) around the world.

Other certifications
The organization also provides other kosher certification labels:

Star-D
Star-D supervision is provided for certain non-Cholov Yisroel dairy products and establishments. Traditional Star-K certification may be applied only if the product is chalav yisrael (that is, milk that has been milked under the supervision of a religiously observant Jew). Star-D products need not be chalav yisrael, though they must meet all other Star-K standards.

The Star-D label is administered by the Star-K but sponsored by the National Council of Young Israel of the United States, and many well-known brands have qualified for Star-D certification. Rav Naftali Burnstein, Shlita, Rav of Young Israel of Cleveland, is the Rav HaMachshir.

Star-S
Star-S is another Star-K certification label. It is provided for products that are Kosher for Passover but with kitniyot ingredients.

Like those marked with the OU's OU-Kitniyot label, these products are permitted to Sephardi but not to Ashkenazi Jews on Passover.

History
The organization, led then as now by Rabbi  Heinemann, was previously named Vaad Hakashrus.

References

External links
 

Orthodox Judaism in Baltimore
Kosher food certification organizations
Religious consumer symbols